The Golden Streets of Glory is the sixth solo studio album by American singer-songwriter Dolly Parton. It was released on February 15, 1971, by RCA Victor. The album was produced by Bob Ferguson. It peaked at number 22 on the Billboard Top Country Albums chart. No singles were released from the album, but the title track was released as the B-side of the religious single "Comin' for to Carry Me Home" in May 1971. The album was nominated for Best Sacred Performance at the 14th Annual Grammy Awards. The album's liner notes were written by Parton's maternal grandfather, Rev. Jake Owens.

Critical reception

The review published in the February 27, 1971 issue of Billboard said, "Sacred music is an essential part of the country field, and with this album Dolly Parton shows her knowledge of this material. Her vocals are full of sincerity and include such standards as "How Great Thou Art", "Wings of a Dove", and "I Believe"."

Cashbox published a review in the issue dated February 13, which said, "There has always been a tremendous similarity between country music and gospel music, and with this album, Dolly Parton closes the gap. Already one of the top female vocalists in her field, this new LP will practically immortalize her. It is honest, sincere, direct, and religious–all in one. "I Believe", "Yes, I See God", "Heaven's Just a Prayer Away", "Book of Life", "Lord, Hold My Hand", and "Wings
of a Dove", are only a sampling of the selections that will make this new Dolly Parton album one of the all time best sellers."

Commercial performance
The album peaked at number 22 on the Billboard Top Country Albums chart.

Accolades
The album was nominated for Best Sacred Performance at the 14th Annual Grammy Awards.

Recording
Recording sessions for the album took place at RCA Studio B in Nashville, Tennessee, on May 11, 12 and 13, 1970.

Reissues
The album was reissued on CD for the first time in 1993 as Golden Streets of Glory, with the track listing arranged in a different order, and again in 1997 under the title I Believe, using the 1993 track order. It was reissued again in 2010 as Letter to Heaven: Songs of Faith and Inspiration, with seven bonus tracks, including the 1971 single "Comin' for to Carry Me Home," which did not make the original album track listing, and an unreleased song from the original album sessions, "Would You Know Him (If You Saw Him)". The album was made available as a digital download on August 19, 2016.

Track listing

Personnel
Adapted from the album liner notes.
Bob Ferguson – producer
Les Leverett – cover photo
Rev. Jake Owens – liner notes
Al Pachucki – recording engineer
Dolly Parton – lead vocals
Roy Shockley – recording technician

Charts

Release history

References

Dolly Parton albums
1971 albums
Albums produced by Bob Ferguson (music)
RCA Records albums